Ranchers Bees FC is a Nigerian football club based in Kaduna. Their home stadium is Ranchers Bees Stadium,  Kaduna Township Stadium.

History

1980s
Originally known as the DIC (Defense Industry Corp.) Bees, they were bought by Alhadji Muktar Mohammed Aruwa in the 1980s and renamed "Ranchers Bees."

DIC Bees participated in the 1983 Nigerian first division but lost the 1983 Nigerian Cup to Enugu Rangers on penalty kicks.

2000s
They were promoted to the Nigeria Premier League after the 2008–09 season by finishing second in  the Nigeria Division 1 with 51 points. For the 2009–10 season, they played some matches in Kano as their stadium was being prepared for the 2009 FIFA U-17 World Cup. They finished the season banished to Calabar and then Minna after fans attacked referees at a home game against Sunshine Stars F.C. They were relegated to the Nigeria National League with two games left after a 6–0 loss at Kwara United F.C.

Achievements
West African Club Championship (UFOA Cup): 1
1989

Performance in CAF competitions
CAF Cup Winners' Cup: 1 appearance
1988 – Finalist
Nigeria national league: runner up 2009/10 season
Nigeria national league champions 2012/13 season

Current squad

                          Jaiye yusuf

References

External links
Bees threaten protest over stadium (Kickoff Nigeria)
How Bees secured historic win over Dolphins
NPL gives Bees new hive in Calabar
"Bees will sting again"-Peters

Football clubs in Nigeria
Kaduna
Sports clubs in Nigeria